Juntos Otra Vez may refer to:

 Juntos Otra Vez (Juan Gabriel and Rocío Dúrcal album), 1997
 Juntos Otra Vez (Los Bukis and Los Yonic's album), 1989